"Funhouse" is a song by American singer-songwriter Pink from her fifth studio album of the same name. It was released as the fifth single from the album on August 3, 2009. The track was written by Pink, Jimmy Harry and Tony Kanal who also produced the song. It holds the title of the album and, just like most of the album's tracks, the song speaks about Pink's split with motocrossrider Carey Hart. Pink performed the song on September 16, 2009, on the Jimmy Kimmel Live! concert stage.

Reception

Critical reception
Billboard gave the song a very positive review, saying "Pink again displays her versatility on this complex number, which calls for blues, funk and rock vocal stylings that few other pop stars could pull off. The singer delivers with full force, colliding with lively guitar licks and hints of synth" and giving it an 81% approval.

Chart performance
"Funhouse" became Pink's 16th top 10 single in Australia, climbing to a chart peak of number six on 2 August 2009. The song also became Pink's fifth consecutive No. 1 single on the Australian Airplay Chart, with all four previous singles from Funhouse also reaching the top. In New Zealand, the song debuted at number 18 on August 3, 2009, becoming Pink's fifth consecutive top twenty hit from the Funhouse album; it peaked at number 15. "Funhouse" first appeared on the UK Singles Chart on July 5, 2009, at number 155, and peaked at twenty-nine. The song was also added to the B List of the BBC Radio 1 Playlist. In the week of August 4, 2009, "Funhouse" debuted at the Dutch Top 40 at number 31, making it Pink's 19th entry on the chart. "Funhouse" debuted on the Canadian Hot 100 at No. 80 and rose to a peak of No. 21. The song was released on August 25, 2009, in the US, and in the week ending October 3, the song debuted at number 23 on the Bubbling Under Hot 100 chart. The following week, the song debuted on the Billboard Hot 100 at No. 97, later peaking at No. 44.

Music video
The music video was directed by Dave Meyers and premiered on June 20, 2009, in the United Kingdom on 4music at 11:00am. Tony Kanal of No Doubt, also the co-writer and the producer of the song, appears in a cameo, playing a piano. The video takes place in a barren lot that is later shown to be what's left of a house that is still burning. There are 'evil clowns' throughout the area who are picking though the rubble and playing the instruments as the band. The video begins as it pans low to the ground showing an "Elvis" grave briefly. Pink emerges from an old empty pool and begins to sing the first verse. She proceeds to kick over a toilet and picks up a framed photo. She throws it behind her. She passes a toaster and now it shows that she is in a burning fun house. She dances past a few 'evil clowns'. It shows more of the burning remains of the building. She picks up a stick and throws it down. Then an 'evil clown' turns around and the camera has a close up of its face. She counts down from 9. (She quickly shows her middle finger on '5' but on most versions of the video that is blurred out.) She moves to a table and takes a sip of some red liquid but becomes disgusted and throws it down. She jumps onto a mattress attached to a chain which two 'evil clowns' are pulling. She gets off the mattress and climbs onto the burning fun house. It shows four 'evil clowns' (Two are miming with each other, one is playing the guitar and the last is just standing on its own.) She goes over to the guitar playing clown and dances with it. She proceeds to count down from 9 again. She climbs through a doggie door to find Tony Kanal playing the piano. Pink moves to a motorcycle and puts on sunglasses and a leather jacket. In the background a voice is counting down from 9. At one she rides away on the motorcycle as the house explodes. It then shows her riding her motorcycle on a road as the song ends. In the music video, Pink wore a white tank top with white skinny jeans with black boots.

The Funhouse Freakshow Edition
As a part of the Funhouse Freakshow, alternate videos for "Funhouse", "Please Don't Leave Me" and "Leave Me Alone (I'm Lonely)" were shot.

The video for "Funhouse" directed by Cole Walliser shows Pink singing onstage along with a band consisting of clowns and the staff of a circus. She wears the same outfit that appears on the cover of "Glitter in the Air". The video is entirely shot in black and white, and it's the only one, among the Funhouse Freakshow videos where Pink lip-syncs the words of the song. The video appears on the bonus DVD accompanying the deluxe edition of Pink's compilation album, Greatest Hits... So Far!!!.

Track listing
 "Funhouse" (album version) – 3:24
 "Funhouse" (Digital Dog remix) – 5:57

Charts

Weekly charts

Year-end charts

All-time charts

Certifications

Release history

References

2009 singles
Music videos directed by Dave Meyers (director)
Pink (singer) songs
Songs written by Pink (singer)
Songs written by Tony Kanal
Songs written by Jimmy Harry
2008 songs
LaFace Records singles
Sony Music singles